Sebastian Tudu (born June 17, 1967) is a Bangladeshi Catholic priest. He is the seventh and current Bishop of Dinajpur, having been appointed by Pope Benedict XVI in 2011. He is the first Santali Bishop in Bangladesh.

Early life and education 
Sebastian Tudu Marino was born in Changura, a village of Gaibandha District, on June 17, 1967. He completed his secondary education at St. Philip's High School and higher secondary education at Dinajpur Government School. Then he moved to Dhaka and got admitted into Notre Dame College. He earned a Bachelor of Arts degree from there while living at St. Joseph's Minor Seminary. He also attended Holy Spirit Major Seminary later. He earned a doctoral degree in missiology at Pontifical Urban University in Rome from 2003 to 2007.

Career 
Tudu was ordained a priest on December 30, 1999, at Mariampur parish, Dinajpur. In 2000 he became the assistant priest of St. Francis Parish. But, in 2003, he left Bangladesh for higher education. He returned to Bangladesh in 2007 and was appointed as an assistant priest of Fatima Rani Church. After 2009 he worked as vice-rector of the Holy Spirit Major Seminary, located in Dhaka. 

On October 29, 2011, Pope Benedict XVI appointed him as the seventh bishop of Dinajpur. He was ordained a bishop on January 27, 2012, at Dinajpur by Joseph Salvador Marino. He is also a member of Catholic Bishops’ Conference of Bangladesh and Caritas Bangladesh.

Reference

External links 

Pontifical Urban University alumni
Notre Dame College, Dhaka alumni
1967 births
20th-century Roman Catholic bishops in Bangladesh
Living people
Santali people
People from Gaibandha District
Bishops appointed by Pope Benedict XVI
Roman Catholic bishops in Bangladesh
Roman Catholic bishops of Dinajpur